Blackmail is a 2005 Indian Hindi-language action thriller film directed by Anil Devgan, which stars Ajay Devgn, Sunil Shetty and Priyanka Chopra in the lead roles. The film is inspired by the 1996 Hollywood film Ransom. This was the second movie directed by Ajay's brother Anil. He directed Raju Chacha earlier in the year 2000.

Plot
Inspector Abhay Rathod is an honest and diligent police officer employed with the Mumbai Police. He is assigned the case of racketeer and criminal don, Shekhar Mohan. Abhay successfully entraps and arrests Shekhar and has him sentenced to jail.

Abhay is now the Assistant Commissioner of Police, with a happy family, wife Sajana and son Chirag. Having completed his jail term, Shekhar Mohan is looking to seek vengeance against Abhay. On finding out that Abhay is the only one who knows the whereabouts of his loss, Shekhar kidnaps Chirag and tricks Abhay into believing that he has killed Chirag. Grief-stricken, Abhay's wife tells Shekhar that Chirag is his lost son. On finding out Chirag loves cars, hellbent on earning Chirag's affection, Shekhar takes him to various racecourses. Thrilled at watching so many fast sports cars, Chirag warms up to uncle Shekhar. But, with Abhay and the police closing in fast on him, will Shekhar maintain his son's love?

Cast
Ajay Devgn as Shekhar Mohan
Sunil Shetty as ACP Abhay Rathod
Diya Mirza as Anjali Mohan, Shekhar's wife
Priyanka Chopra as Sanjana Rathod, Abhay's wife
Parth Dave as Chirag Rathod, Abhay & Sanjana's son
Mukesh Rishi as Chhota
Monalisa as Item Girl

Music

All songs composed by Himesh Reshammiya while all lyrics were penned by Sameer.
Track Listing

References

External links

2000s Hindi-language films
2005 films
Films scored by Himesh Reshammiya
Films set in Mumbai
Indian action thriller films
2005 action thriller films